Henryk Rossman (24 December 1896 – 23 February 1937) was a Polish lawyer and political activist of the nationalist movement, co-founder of the National Radical Camp and later splinter faction ONR-ABC. He was one of the inmates of Detention Camp Bereza Kartuska.

References

1896 births
1937 deaths
Lawyers from Warsaw
People from Warsaw Governorate
National League (Poland) members
National Party (Poland) politicians
Camp of Great Poland politicians
National Radical Camp politicians
Politicians from Warsaw
Polish nationalists
Polish prisoners and detainees
Inmates of Bereza Kartuska Prison